Endothenia sororiana is a species of moth belonging to the family Tortricidae.

Synonym:
  Penthina sororiana Herrich-Schaffer, 1850 (= basionym)

References

Endotheniini
Moths described in 1850